Anathallis cuspidata is a species of orchid plant native to Panama.

References 

cuspidata
Flora of Panama